The Engie Open Nantes Atlantique is a tournament for professional female tennis players on indoor hardcourts. The event is classified as a $60,000 ITF Women's Circuit tournament and has been held in Nantes, France, since 2003.

Past finals

Singles

Doubles

External links
 Official website 

ITF Women's World Tennis Tour
Hard court tennis tournaments
Tennis tournaments in France
Recurring sporting events established in 2003